Attack Squadron may refer to:

A type of United States Air Force unmanned aerial vehicle squadron – see List of United States Air Force attack squadrons
A former type of United States Navy aircraft squadron – see List of inactive United States Navy aircraft squadrons
Jane's Attack Squadron, a World War II flight simulator
Attack Squadron!, a 1963 Japanese film